Braulio Evaristo Carrillo Colina (March 20, 1800, Cartago, Costa Rica – May 15, 1845) was the Head of State of Costa Rica (the title as it was known before the reform of 1848) during two periods: the first between 1835 and 1837, and the de facto between 1838 and 1842.

Before becoming head of state, Carrillo held a number of public positions, including Judge and Chairman of the Supreme Court of Costa Rica, member of the Legislative Assembly of Costa Rica and member of the Congress of the Federal Republic of Central America.

Biography
Braulio Carrillo studied law at the University of León in Nicaragua. At the early age of 28 years was elected to the legislature for a period of two years, and for a brief period held the position of president of the legislature. In 1834, he was sent as a representative of Costa Rica to the Central American Congress, in El Salvador.

Upon the resignation of Costa Rica's head of state José Rafael Gallegos in 1835, Carrillo was elected to complete the term of Gallegos. Because of their strong character and that the assembly repealed in August of that year the Ambulance Act, the cities of Cartago, Heredia and Alajuela took up arms against the government in mid-September, but were defeated after a civil war lasted a fortnight.

Carrillo was a candidate for reelection in 1837, but was defeated by Manuel Aguilar, who was overthrown in 1838 by a cuartelazo. Carrillo again became the Head of State, with absolute powers. He convened a constituent assembly, which, in November, declared that the state was separated from the Federal Republic of Central America, and thus Costa Rica became a sovereign country. The constituent session was suspended in December 1838.

In 1841 Carrillo issued the Guarantee Law, which made him head of state for life. There were a number of changes in the social life of Costa Rica, and Carrillo became known as the "Architect of the Costa Rican National State". He worked to prohibit vagrancy, vice and crime. He greatly boost the development of Costa Rica and introduced order in the Civil Service. His efforts to open a path to communicate with the Central Valley Matina on the Caribbean coast, could not be satisfactorily completed, as the government of Francisco Morazán stopped work when they were well advanced. Due to this effort, the National Park located between the provinces of Limón and San José and a highway between San José and Guápiles carries his name today. Braulio Carrillo National Park is also named after him.

In 1842 Francisco Morazán, former Federal President Central America, invaded Costa Rica and seized power. Carrillo went into exile and settled in El Salvador, where he was killed in 1845.

Achievements of Carrillo's governments
 Abolished Ambulance Act and established the capital in San Juan del Murciélago, now Tibás.
 Reduced the number of public holidays in 1836.
 Enacted the General Code of the State of Costa Rica in 1841.
 Developed a plan to boost agriculture.
 Costa Rica left the Central American Federation and assumed full sovereignty.
 He organized new Courts of Justice.

References

External links
  Braulio Carrillo Colina

1800 births
1845 deaths
People from Cartago Province
Costa Rican people of Spanish descent
Presidents of Costa Rica
Members of the Legislative Assembly of Costa Rica
19th-century Costa Rican judges
People murdered in El Salvador
Costa Rican liberals
1845 murders in Central America